Kurt Doles (born August 2, 1973) is an American composer and bass clarinetist. He is best known for his slow, quiet instrumental pieces which are frequently written for unusual groups of instruments. Sometimes associated with the group of postminimalist California-based composers represented on the Cold Blue record label run by composer Jim Fox, he has collaborated with musicians  DAC Crowell and Daniel Patrick Quinn on various improvised, electroacoustic ambient recording projects. Mercury, a collaboration with DAC Crowell, was released on Suilven Recordings.

See also 
List of ambient music artists

External links
Oregon Festival of American Music '05: Kurt Doles
Evil Sponge: Review by Lawton of Mercury DAC Crowell & Kurt Doles
Ambient Music: Suilven Recordings
Playlouder: Review by L. Turner of Don't Look Down DAC Crowell, Kurt Doles, & Daniel Patrick Quinn
Sunday Times (London): Review by Stewart Lee of "Don't Look Down"

1973 births
Living people
American male classical composers
American classical composers
American clarinetists
Bass clarinetists
Ambient musicians
21st-century classical composers
21st-century American composers
21st-century clarinetists
21st-century American male musicians